The King's Academy may refer to:

U.S. schools
 The King's Academy (California), Sunnyvale, California
 The King's Academy (Florida), West Palm Beach, Florida
 The King's Academy (Tennessee), Seymour, Tennessee
 The Kings Academy (Indiana), Jonesboro, Indiana

Other locations
 The King's Academy, Middlesbrough, England, UK
 King's Academy Prospect, Reading, England, UK
 The King's Church of England Academy, Staffordshire, England, UK
 King's Academy, Madaba, Jordan

See also
 King's Leadership Academy (disambiguation)
 King's College (disambiguation), various colleges
 King's School (disambiguation), various schools